The Italy men's national under-23 volleyball team represents Italy in international men's volleyball competitions and friendly matches under  the age 23 and it is ruled by the Italian Volleyball Federation.

Results

FIVB U23 World Championship
 Champions   Runners up   Third place   Fourth place

Team

Current squad

The following is the Italian roster in the 2015 FIVB Volleyball Men's U23 World Championship.

Head coach: Michele Totire

References

External links
  Official website 

National men's under-23 volleyball teams
Volleyball
Volleyball in Italy
Men's volleyball in Italy